"Tin Soldier" is a song released by the English rock band Small Faces on 2 December 1967, written by Steve Marriott (credited to Marriott/Lane). The song peaked at number nine in the UK singles chart and number 38 in Canada. It has since been covered by many other notable rock artists.

Song profile 
Tin Soldier was originally written by Steve Marriott for singer P.P. Arnold, but Marriott liked it so much he kept it himself. It was a song that he wrote to his first wife, Jenny Rylance. P.P. Arnold can be heard singing backing vocals on the song and also performed as guest singer at television recordings of the song. The song signalled a return to the band's R&B roots whilst continuing their forays into psychedelic rock and other musical experiments. When Tin Soldier was released the BBC informed the band that the last line of the song had to be removed from all TV and radio broadcasts, mistakenly believing that Marriott sang "sleep with you", when in fact the lyric is "sit with you".  Marriott explained that the song was about "getting into someone's mind—not their body". "Tin Soldier" reached number nine in the UK Singles Chart and remains one of Small Faces' best known songs.

Talking about the song, and the influence of his wife Jenny, Marriott stated:

The song seems to have been influenced by Hans Christian Andersen's fairy tale The Steadfast Tin Soldier, the story of an imperfect tin soldier's desire for a paper ballerina. The opening lyric is "I am a little tin soldier that wants to jump into your fire".

Upon reaching No. 73 in the U.S. with this single, their label Immediate Records abandoned its attempts to penetrate the American market. "Tin Soldier" would ultimately be the last song performed live by the Small Faces during their original incarnation; It was performed on 8 March 1969 at Springfield Ballroom (now demolished and replaced by the football stand of Springfield Stadium) in Jersey.

Mojo readers' poll
In 1997, some 30 years after the song's original release, Mojo voted "Tin Soldier" the tenth-best single of all time, in a readers' poll.  The poll placed it ahead of anything by The Who or The Rolling Stones.
The song has also been much mentioned over the years by Paul Weller and featured in Noel Gallagher's personal all-time top ten song list.

Personnel
Steve Marriott – lead and backing vocals, acoustic and electric guitars
Ronnie Lane – bass guitar, backing vocals
Ian McLagan – acoustic and electric pianos, Hammond organ, backing vocals
Kenney Jones – drums

Additional personnel
P.P. Arnold – backing vocals

Charts

Weekly charts

All-time charts

Covers
The song has been covered by Quiet Riot, Lou Gramm, Uriah Heep, Streetheart, Todd Rundgren, The Guess Who, Paul Weller, Transatlantic, and Humble Pie (which also featured Marriott).
Scorpions made a cover of the song for their 2011 album Comeblack.
Progressive rock band Transatlantic covered this song on their 2014 album Kaleidoscope, on disc 2 of the special edition. In October 2007 Tim Rogers, of You Am I, and Talei Wolfgramm performed the track on Australian music quiz show RocKwiz. In 1998 the Argentine musician Charly Garcia recorded a version, in Spanish, on his album El aguante, titled "Soldado de lata". P.P. Arnold has performed the song live.

See also
Small Faces discography

References

External links
Small Faces official website

1967 singles
Small Faces songs
Scorpions (band) songs
Songs written by Steve Marriott
Songs written by Ronnie Lane
1967 songs
Immediate Records singles
Music based on works by Hans Christian Andersen
Works based on The Steadfast Tin Soldier